Trust Conference is an annual conference organized by the Thomson Reuters Foundation. The 2017 event will be held in London on November 15–17 and will look at the global fight against human trafficking and modern-day slavery.

History 

The conference was until 2017 called Trust Women. Trust Women began in 2012. As a direct result of the 2012 Trust Women Conference, the Thomson Reuters Foundation - along with the Manhattan District Attorney Cyrus R. Vance Jr - launched a financial working group to fight human trafficking. Members of the group include some of the world's biggest financial institutions (Bank of America, Citigroup, JPMorgan Chase, Wells Fargo, Barclays, TD Bank, American Express, Western Union) along with U.S. Immigration and Customs Enforcement, the Human Trafficking Pro Bono Legal Center, and NGOs working with trafficking victims. In 2014, the financial working group released a white paper aimed at helping the wider industry to identify and report irregularities in financial transactions that might be linked to human trafficking activity.

Trust Women Advisory Board
 Mabel van Oranje
 Cherie Blair
 Her Majesty Queen Noor
 Cathy Russell
 Stephen Dunbar-Johnson
 John Studzinski
 Livia Firth
 Dr. Sima Samar
 Claudia Prado

External links 
 Trust Women Conference
 Guardian: Breaking the silence on slavery: why companies need to do more 
 Evening Standard: Sex slaves' cage horror: London woman exposes torment in Indian brothels
 BBC Woman’s Hour: "I've waited for this revolution all my life" Egyptian feminist and campaigner Mona Eltahawy 
 BBC Radio 4- Woman's Hour- Interview with Ayaan Hirsi Ali
 My husband was tortured for my beliefs
 Are women leaders less corrupt? No, but they shake things up
  Queen Noor Expresses Hope on the Rights of Arab Women
 Trust Women Conference: affermare i diritti delle donne in tutto il mondo

Women's organisations based in the United Kingdom
Women's conferences
Women in London